Werner Cohn (1926 – October 19, 2018) was a sociologist who wrote on the sociology of Jews and of Romani people, and political sociology. He was a Professor Emeritus at the University of British Columbia.

Biography

Born in Berlin, Germany, Cohn received his BSS in Sociology from City College  (New York) in 1951. He completed his MA (1954) and PhD (1956) at the New School for Social Research. He joined the University of British Columbia's Department of Anthropology and Sociology in 1960 and remained there until taking early retirement in 1986. Cohn's research focused on the sociology of Jews and small political movements, and he developed an interest in researching Romani people. He began his research on this topic in 1966/67 during a sabbatical in France. He continued with his studies of the Romani culture and language and returned to Europe meeting with Romani groups and with many well known scholars of the Romani. Over the years Cohn wrote numerous articles on the Romani in various scholarly journals and in 1973 he wrote The Gypsies which summarized his findings in the field.  He died in Brooklyn, New York in 2018.

Selected works

Journal articles

Books

References

External links
Home Page
Fringe Groups (Political Blog)
List of Writings by Cohn
"Partners in Hate - Noam Chomsky and the Holocaust Deniers", Avukah Press, Cambridge

1926 births
2018 deaths
Jewish Canadian writers
Writers from Berlin
Jewish Canadian sociologists
Canadian sociologists
German emigrants to Canada
Canadian people of German-Jewish descent
City College of New York alumni
Academic staff of the University of British Columbia